HD 73882 is a visual binary system with the components separated by  and a combined spectral class of O8. One of stars is an eclipsing binary system.  The period of variability is listed as both 2.9199 days and 20.6 days, possibly due to the secondary being a spectroscopic binary star.

Components 
The apparent magnitudes of the visible components A and B are 7.8 and 8.8 respectively.  The primary, A, is thought to be the eclipsing binary.  It shows eclipses every , but there are thought to be both primary and secondary minima with the actual orbital period being .  Additional radial velocity variations with a period of  have also been found, suggesting that one of the components is a spectroscopic binary.

The spectral types of the individual components are not known. The observed combined spectral type is variously given as O8.5V, O9III, or O8.5IV. The spectrum is presumed to be dominated by the primary pair which are more than a magnitude brighter than the secondary. The eclipsing components are likely to be two similar stars since the primary and secondary eclipses are almost identical.

Circumstellar nebula
The star system, located behind the Vela Supernova Remnant, is obscured by the translucent nebula , located near the Vela Molecular Ridge nebulae complex. The nebula is illuminated by this star system and probably has a close physical association with it, together with brighter reflection nebula NGC 2626. The nebulae are rich in hydrogen (including deuterated hydrogen) and also contain detectable amounts of sodium, carbon monoxide, and other carbon compounds, including polycyclic aromatic hydrocarbons, and thiols. The nebula associated with the HD 73882 is one of the few exhibiting emission from compounds containing three carbon atoms. The nebula has unusually low levels of oxygen compared to the average interstellar medium.

References 

Vela (constellation)
J08390953-4025092
CD-39 4631
042433
073882
O-type subgiants
HD 73882
Vela, NX